Alamo Square is a residential neighborhood in San Francisco, California with a park of the same name. Located in the Western Addition, its boundaries are  Buchanan Street on the east, Turk Street on the north, Baker Street on the west, and Page Street Street on the south.

Alamo Square Park, the neighborhood's focal point and namesake, consists of four city blocks at the top of a hill overlooking much of downtown San Francisco, with a number of large and architecturally distinctive mansions along the perimeter, including the "Painted Ladies", a well-known postcard motif. The park is bordered by Hayes Street to the south, Steiner Street to the east, Fulton Street to the north, and Scott Street to the west.  Named after the lone cottonwood tree ("alamo" in Spanish), Alamo Hill, was a watering hole on the horseback trail from Mission Dolores to the Presidio in the 1800s.  In 1856, Mayor James Van Ness created a  park surrounding the watering hole, creating "Alamo Square".

Attractions and characteristics

Alamo Square Park includes a playground and a tennis court, and is frequented by neighbors, tourists, and dog owners. On a clear day, the Transamerica Pyramid building and the tops of the Golden Gate Bridge and Bay Bridge can be seen from the park's center. The San Francisco City Hall can be seen directly down Fulton Street. The area is part of the city's fifth Supervisorial district and is served by several Muni bus lines, including the 5, 21, 22, and 24. In 2016 it was closed for a $4.3 million renovation lasting seven months.

Architecture

The Alamo Square neighborhood is characterized by Victorian architecture that was left largely untouched by the urban renewal projects in other parts of the Western Addition.

A row of Victorian houses facing the park on Steiner Street, known as the "Painted Ladies", are often shown in the foreground of panoramic pictures of the city's downtown area. A number of movies, television shows and commercials have been filmed in or around Alamo Square. The park features heavily in the 1978 horror film The Invasion of the Body Snatchers, and the 2012 romantic comedy The Five-Year Engagement. The opening sequence of the American sitcom Full House (1987-1995) features a romp in Alamo Square Park with the famous row of Victorians in the background.

There are many architecturally significant mansions on the perimeter of the park, including the William Westerfeld House, the Archbishop's Mansion, the residences of the Russian and German Imperial consuls in the early 1900s, and the mansions on the block diagonally across from the Painted Ladies. In 1984, the Alamo Square Historic District was created by the Board of Supervisors, stating:

Demographics

The demographics of the neighborhood are characteristic of other urban neighborhoods that have undergone gentrification: many young people and upper-middle-class homeowners, in addition to a diverse older population. Divisadero Street, which divides Alamo Square from North Panhandle, is home to a number of small businesses including a growing collection of hip and popular restaurants and bars, catering to the young tech professionals who are contributing to the booming San Francisco startup economy, and who value Alamo Square's weather, conveniently central location and easy access to transportation options.

Efforts on the part of Alamo Square and North Panhandle residents and merchants have led to restrictions on chain stores on the corridor. 

Neighborhood groups include the Alamo Square Neighborhood Association and the Haight-Divisadero Neighborhood Merchants Association.

Notable residents
Author Alice Walker lived in one of the "Painted Lady" Victorians across from Alamo Square park up to the mid-1990s.

See also

Parks of San Francisco
49-Mile Scenic Drive

References

External links

Map of district 5 of the county, which Alamo Square is a part of (PDF file)
Alamo Square Neighborhood Association
Alamo Square, from San Francisco Parks Alliance

Neighborhoods in San Francisco
Parks in San Francisco
Squares in San Francisco
Hills of San Francisco
Western Addition, San Francisco
San Francisco Designated Landmarks